Newbury Bridge, also known as Kennet Bridge or Town Bridge, is a bridge across the River Kennet in the town centre of Newbury in the English county of Berkshire. The bridge carries Bridge Street, which links Northbrook Street, to the north of the river, with Bartholomew Street, to the south. The river channel under the bridge is also used by boats navigating the Kennet and Avon Canal. The current bridge was built between 1769 and 1772 and has three arches, although the two outer arches are now hidden by flanking buildings. It is a Grade II* listed structure.

History 
The first bridge across the River Kennet in Newbury dates back to the Middle Ages, and the earliest reference to it is an account of its reconstruction in the 14th Century. In 1312, King Edward II directed that the bridge should be kept in good order. However on 5 February of that year, the bridge collapsed unexpectedly. The bridge was presumably rebuilt, as in 1644, during the Second Battle of Newbury, a guard was placed on the bridge by the Cavaliers to prevent an attack from the south by the Roundheads.

In 1723, the Kennet Navigation made the River Kennet navigable downstream from Newbury to the River Thames in Reading, but the navigation terminated to the east of the bridge and did not pass under it. In 1726, the wooden bridge was swept away by floods and subsequently replaced with another similar bridge. In 1769 this bridge was demolished and work started on the current triple arched stone and brick bridge. The work was under the direction of the builder, who is variously reported as James Clarke or James Clark, and was completed in 1772.

In 1794, work started on the centre section of the Kennet and Avon Canal, which would extend the Kennet Navigation to Bath, thus providing a through route between London and Bristol. The new canal used the stretch of the River Kennet under the bridge to gain access to Newbury Lock, the first lock on the new section. As the bridge pre-dated the canal, there was no provision for a towpath under the bridge. In the absence of this, a line to haul the barge had to be floated under the bridge and then re-attached to the horse where the tow path resumed. Over time, grooves were worn by hauling lines under the bridge and these can still be seen today.

By the outbreak of World War II, Newbury Bridge still provided the only through road crossing over the Kennet in the Newbury area, and military planners were concerned about the consequences of it being damaged or destroyed in an air raid. The American Bridge was to be the first of three bypass bridges built. The second was a bridge on the first Newbury by-pass,  further downstream from the American Bridge, opened in 1963. When the first by-pass proved insufficient to cope with the volume of traffic travelling north-south through the Newbury area, a second by-pass was built to the west of Newbury.

References

External links 

Bridges completed in 1772
Bridges in Berkshire
Grade II* listed bridges in England
Grade II* listed buildings in Berkshire
Kennet and Avon Canal
Roads in Berkshire